Guanine nucleotide-binding protein G(o) subunit alpha is a protein that in humans is encoded by the GNAO1 gene.

Mutations in this gene have been shown to cause epileptic encephalopathy.

Interactions
GNAO1 has been shown to interact with:
 RGS5,
 RGS19, 
 RGS20, and
 RIC8A

References

Further reading